Teasing Master Takagi-san is an anime series adapted from the manga of the same title by Sōichirō Yamamoto. The second season was announced on January 10, 2019. The staff and cast reprised their respective roles. It aired from July 7 to September 22, 2019, on Tokyo MX and other channels, with episodes being exclusively streamed on Netflix Japan. A worldwide release on Netflix took place on December 6, 2019. The opening theme for the second season is  performed by Yuiko Ōhara.


Episode list

Notes

References

External links
  
 

2
2019 Japanese television seasons